Cheniere Energy, Inc. is a liquefied natural gas (LNG) company headquartered in Houston, Texas. In February 2016 it became the first US company to export liquefied natural gas. As of 2018 it is a Fortune 500 company.

Company history
Initially an oil-and-gas exploration company, the company shifted its focus in the early 2000s to developing liquified natural gas regas terminals, beginning with a terminal in Sabine Pass, Louisiana in March 2005. The company faltered in the late 2000s as LNG imports dried up due to international competition. In 2016 Cheniere founder Charif Souki was ousted after a dispute with investor Carl Icahn.

In the late 2010s, as natural gas production rose in the United States, the company grew significantly and in 2016 became an exporter of LNG to international markets under its newly appointed CEO, Jack Fusco (former President and CEO of Calpine).

Cheniere published its second annual corporate responsibility report in June 2021 . Cheniere says it is taking innovative steps towards quantifying, monitoring, reporting and verifying data in partnership with producers and institutions in an effort to find opportunities to lower emissions. 

In 2018 Cheniere Energy signed an agreement with CPC Corporation, Taiwan to supply liquefied natural gas for 25 years in a contract worth approximately US$25b. Deliveries to Taiwan are set to begin in 2021.

References

External links 
 Cheniere Energy
 Cheniere Corporate Responsibility

Companies based in Houston
Natural gas companies of the United States
Companies listed on NYSE American